Sincina is a small town and commune in the Cercle of Koutiala in the Sikasso Region of southern Mali. The commune covers an area of 210 square kilometers and includes 7 settlements. In the 2009 census it had a population of 17,025. The town of Sincina, the administrative centre (chef-lieu) of the commune, is only 5 km southeast of the center of Koutiala. As Koutiala expands the commune will become a suburb of the town.

References

External links
.

Communes of Sikasso Region